Amparo Delgado Vega (born 18 February 1997), better known as Amparito, is a Spanish footballer who plays as a midfielder for Sevilla.

Club career
Amparito started her career at Sevilla.

References

External links
Profile at La Liga

1997 births
Living people
Women's association football midfielders
Spanish women's footballers
Footballers from Seville
Sevilla FC (women) players
Primera División (women) players